iArchives, Inc., formerly Automated Solutions, Inc., was an dotcom company based in Lindon, Utah, United States. iArchives was acquired on  by Ancestry.com, Inc., where it was merged with Ancestry's other inhouse and purchased archive holdings. Since at least 2019, Ancestry's archive service is called Newspapers.com.

References

American genealogy websites
Online companies of the United States
Privately held companies based in Utah
Software companies based in Utah
American companies established in 1994
1994 establishments in Utah